José Roberto Pulido (born March 1, 1950), known as Roberto "El Primo" Pulido, is an American musician whose career spans five decades. Pulido has been recognized as a Tejano music pioneer for his introduction of the accordion and saxophone into his music which "helped bridged the traditional conjunto and the modern Tejano camps" in the mid-1970s. Pulido is the father of Tejano musicians Alma Pulido and Bobby Pulido.

Background 
Roberto "El Primo" Pulido was born and raised in Edinburg, Texas to José "Don Chuy" Pulido and Adelina. Pulido first gained interest in the music industry after his uncle Leonel Pulido's band (the Los Cardenales de Leonel Pulido) introduced him to the genre and taught him the basics of music. At the age of twelve, Pulido repaired his grandfather's guitar and began playing it and singing around the house. When he was fifteen, he joined the Los Hermanos Layton in Elsa, Texas. Pulido's father bought him his first saxophone in the 1960s. In 1969, a senior, Pulido garnered several music scholarships and enrolled at Pan American University and took music studies as his major. A year later, he married Diana Montes, daughter of Mario Montes of Los Donnenos. In 1973, Pulido gained a bachelor's degree and began teaching music in high school for an annual salary of $6,100. After a couple of years, Pulido retired from teaching and started his own band Los Clasicos, which included his uncle Leonel and brothers Roel and Joel Pulido on sax. The band was signed to indie labels and produced only regional hits, including "Copa Tras Copa", "Simplemente", "Senorita Cantinera", "No Nos Quieren, Corazon", and "Flecha Envenenada".

Pulido won the first Tejano Music Award for Male Vocalist of the Year and the Tejano Music Award for Male Entertainer of the Year in 1981 and won once more in 1985 (Male Vocalist of the Year). In 1989, Pulido signed with EMI Latin, which helped increased public awareness and record sales. His 1994 album, Te Vi Partir, peaked at number 33 on the United States Billboard Top Latin Albums chart and number 12 on the Billboard Regional Mexican Albums chart. The album also produced the top twenty single "Ya Ahora Es Tarde". That same year, EMI Latin released a compilation album Branding Icons featuring Pulido on the album with his son Bobby Pulido on the song "Contigo". The song was responsible for jump-starting Bobby's musical career.

Discography 
Si Te Decides (1992)
Dulces Recuerdos (1993)
Te Vi Partir (1994)
Corazon de Hielo (1995)
Con Sabor a Tejas (1995)	
Con Las Alas Rotas/Dame Amor (1995)
Toro Prieto (1995)		
Que Esperabas de Mi (1996)	
Bandolero (1996)	
Un Rosal (1996)
Otra Vez a la Cantina (1996)
Amor Ingrato (1996)
Simplemente (1996)
Todavia Creo en el Amor (1998)

See also 

 Music of Texas
 List of Hispanic and Latino Americans

References

Notes

External links 
 
 

1950 births
20th-century American singers
American mariachi musicians
American musicians of Mexican descent
American ranchera singers
Capitol Records artists
Cumbia musicians
EMI Latin artists
Hispanic and Latino American musicians
People from Edinburg, Texas
Polka musicians
Singers from Texas
Spanish-language singers of the United States
Tejano musicians
Living people